One Too Many on Board is a 1935 German drama film directed by Gerhard Lamprecht and starring Lída Baarová, Albrecht Schoenhals and René Deltgen. It was shot at the Babelsberg Studios in Berlin. The film's sets were designed by the art directors Otto Erdmann and Hans Sohnle. Some scenes were shot on location in Hamburg. A separate French-language version was also released.

Cast

References

Bibliography

External links 
 

1935 films
1935 drama films
Films of Nazi Germany
German drama films
1930s German-language films
Films directed by Gerhard Lamprecht
UFA GmbH films
Seafaring films
Films shot in Hamburg
German multilingual films
German black-and-white films
1935 multilingual films
1930s German films
Films shot at Babelsberg Studios